The leg extension is a resistance weight training exercise that targets the quadriceps muscle (m. quadriceps femoris) in the legs. The exercise is done using a machine called the Leg Extension Machine. There are various manufacturers of these machines and each one is slightly different. Most gym and weight rooms will have the machine in their facility. The leg extension is an isolated exercise targeting one specific muscle group, the quadriceps. It should not be considered as a total leg workout, such as the squat or deadlift.

The exercise consists of bending the leg at the knee and extending the legs, then lowering them back to the original position.

Risk of injury 
Some fitness professionals and coaches advise people to not use an isolating leg extension machine due to the unnatural pressure it places on the knees and ankles.. However, this is a fitness myth based on largely anecdotal evidence rather than peer-reviewed research. Whilst there is some evidence that the leg extension's unnatural moment arm places constant tension on the anterior cruciate ligament (ACL), there is no evidence to suggest that this constant tension increases injury risk outside of individuals with pre-existing ACL injuries. The leg extension is a good exercise for isolating muscular contraction in the quadriceps, but as with all isolation exercises, should be included in a holistic resistance training program working all muscles, especially antagonistic muscle pairs (such as the quadriceps, hamstrings, and gluteal muscles), to avoid muscular imbalances, which are associated with increased injury risk.

References 

Weight training exercises